Park Sung-min (Hangul: 박성민; born 12 May 1990) is a South Korean badminton player. Park started playing badminton in 1999, and as a junior player he was the runner-up of the 2007 German Junior International tournament. He was a part of the Korean junior team who win the mixed team silver medal at the 2007 and 2008 World Junior Championships. At the 2008 Asian Junior Championships, he won the silver medals in the boys' singles and mixed team event.

Achievements

Asian Junior Championships 
Boys' singles

BWF International Challenge/Series 
Men's singles

  BWF International Challenge tournament
  BWF International Series tournament

References

External links 
 

1990 births
Living people
Sportspeople from Incheon
South Korean male badminton players